Ysaline Bonaventure and Rebecca Peterson were the defending champions, but Bonaventure chose not to participate this year. Peterson played alongside Julia Glushko, but lost in the first round to Paula Cristina Gonçalves and Sanaz Marand.
Verónica Cepede Royg and María Irigoyen won the title, defeating Tara Moore and Conny Perrin in the final, 6–1, 7–6(7–5).

Seeds

Draw

References
 Main Draw

Rio Open - Women's Doubles
Rio
Rio Open